The Wedding is an album by krautrock band Oneida. It was released in 2005.

Track listing
"The Eiger" (2:34)
"Lavender" (3:58)
"Spirits" (4:20)
"Run Through My Hair" (3:01)
"High Life" (2:20)
"Did I Die" (3:31)
"You're Drifting" (3:26) 
"Charlemagne" (2:27)
"Know" (1:46)
"Heavenly Choir" (4:17)
"Leaves" (2:57)
"The Beginning Is Nigh" (7:30)
"August Morning Haze" (3:25)

References

2005 albums
Oneida (band) albums
Jagjaguwar albums
Rough Trade Records albums
Three Gut Records albums